Alma Rosa Aguirre Juárez (born 19 February 1929) is a Mexican actress.

Selected filmography
El Sexo Fuerte (1946)
El Pasajero Diez Mil (1946)
Los viejos somos así (1948)
Una Gallega en México (1949)
Nosotras las Taquígrafas (1950)
El Siete Machos (1951)
 Canasta uruguaya (1951)
We Maids (1951)
El fronterizo (1952)
Seven Women (1953)
The Sin of Being a Woman (1955)
El fantasma de la casa roja (1956)
Entre Monjas Anda el Diablo (1972)

References

External links

Alma Rosa Aguirre at the Estrellas de Mexico website 

Mexican film actresses
1929 births
Living people
20th-century Mexican actresses
People from Ciudad Juárez